Newman Lake—historically and alternatively known as Moab—is an unincorporated community in Spokane County, Washington, United States. Newman Lake has a post office with ZIP code 99025. It is also home to Ellerport Airport, a private-use airport. As of the summer of 2014, freshwater jellyfish inhabited the lake.

The area was settled in the 1880s and served by the Northern Pacific Railway, which later ran excursion trains from Spokane. The local post office was renamed from Moab to Newman Lake in the 1930s.

References

External links
Original Newman Lake website
Newman Lake community website

Unincorporated communities in Spokane County, Washington
Unincorporated communities in Washington (state)